Ratangarh Assembly constituency is one of constituencies of Rajasthan Legislative Assembly in the Churu (Lok Sabha constituency).

Ratangarh Constituency covers all voters from Ratangarh tehsil excluding ILRC Golsar and parts of Sujangarh tehsil, which include ILRC Chhapar including Chhapar Municipal Board and ILRC Khuri.

References

See also 
 Member of the Legislative Assembly (India)

Churu district
Assembly constituencies of Rajasthan